This is a list of cricket grounds in Canada.  The grounds included in this list have held first-class, List-A and Twenty20 matches.  Additionally, some have also hosted  One Day Internationals and Twenty20 Internationals.

International grounds

Other Grounds

References

External links
Cricket grounds in Canada at CricketArchive.

Cricket
Canada
Grounds